Oleg Nikolayevich Grebnev (born 4 February 1968) is a retired Russian team handball player who competed at the 1992 and 1996 Summer Olympics. He won a gold medal in 1992 and finished fifth in 1996. He also won the world title in 1993 and 1997 and a European title in 1996.

References

1968 births
Living people
Russian male handball players
Handball players at the 1992 Summer Olympics
Handball players at the 1996 Summer Olympics
Olympic gold medalists for the Unified Team
Olympic handball players of the Unified Team
Soviet male handball players
Olympic handball players of Russia
Olympic medalists in handball
Medalists at the 1992 Summer Olympics
Sportspeople from Volgograd